The 1985 Tennessee Volunteers football team (variously "Tennessee", "UT" or the "Vols") represented the University of Tennessee in the 1985 NCAA Division I-A football season. Playing as a member of the Southeastern Conference (SEC), the team was led by head coach Johnny Majors, in his ninth year, and played their home games at Neyland Stadium in Knoxville, Tennessee. They finished the season with a record of nine wins, one loss and two ties (9–1–2 overall, 5–1 in the SEC), as SEC champions and with a victory over Miami in the 1986 Sugar Bowl. The Volunteers offense scored 325 points while the defense allowed 140 points. At season's end, the Volunteers ranked fourth in both the AP Poll and the Coaches' Poll.

Known to fans as the Sugar Vols for their Sugar Bowl victory, the 1985 squad is frequently recalled as one of the most memorable and beloved teams in UT football history, and has been credited with restoring the program to national prominence.  The team's SEC Championship was the first for the program in 16 years, and its top ten ranking was the program's first in 13 years.

After a strong start to the season, Tennessee suffered a major setback when star quarterback and Heisman Trophy candidate Tony Robinson suffered a season-ending knee injury in a close game against Alabama. The team rallied to finish 6–0–1, however, led by backup quarterback Daryl Dickey, and a defense– nicknamed the "Orange Crush"– that allowed just four touchdowns in its final seven games.  The 1986 Sugar Bowl has been ranked among the team's ten greatest victories of all time.

Before the season
The 1984 Tennessee squad had managed a 7–4–1 record, ending with a narrow 28–27 loss to Maryland in the Sun Bowl.  While they had defeated rival Alabama 28–27, they lost important games to Auburn and Florida, and had been upset by Kentucky.

Prior to the 1985 season, long-time athletic director Bob Woodruff announced his retirement.  Head coach Johnny Majors expressed interest in serving as both coach and athletic director, but the university hired former coach Doug Dickey.

Returning players and roster changes
Quarterback Tony Robinson entered the 1985 season as a candidate for the Heisman Trophy.  During the 1984 season, he had completed 156 of 253 passes for 1,963 yards, falling just short of his predecessor Alan Cockrell's single-season record of 2,021 yards (set in 1983).  His 61.7% completion percentage had broken the single-season record set by Johnny Majors in 1956.  Fifth-year senior Daryl Dickey, Robinson's backup, would start the final seven games after Robinson suffered a season-ending knee injury.  Three redshirt freshmen were competing for the third-string quarterback slot: Jeff Francis, Randy Sanders, and Greg Hargis.

All-American prospect Tim McGee was the leading returning wide receiver, having caught a school record 54 passes in 1984.  McGee entered the 1985 season needing 45 catches, 828 yards, and 5 touchdowns to set school career records in all three categories, a feat which he would accomplish.  McGee was joined in the starting lineup by junior college transfer Eric Swanson (20 catches for 186 yards in 1984), while junior Joey Clinkscales and sophomore Vince Carter would see significant playing time.  Olympic sprinter Sam Graddy joined the team as a receiver during spring practice.  Senior Jeff Smith (6'3", 235 pounds), who had caught 26 passes for 416 yards in 1984, was the team's starting tight end, while Tim Hendrix (6'5", 223) would see significant playing time.

The running back slot was wide open following the graduation of 2nd-team All American Johnnie Jones.  Sophomore Charles Wilson began the season as the starter, and was joined by redshirt freshman Keith Davis and junior Pete Panuska.  One notable addition to the running back corps was Jeff Powell, a member of the track team who had been awarded the football team's final scholarship at the end of spring practice.  Fullback duties were handled by 250-pound junior Sam Henderson, 225-pound sophomore William Howard and 230-pound junior Jim Miller.

The offensive line had lost Raleigh McKenzie and Bill Mayo to graduation, but returned future NFL players David Douglas (6'4", 266 pounds), Bruce Wilkerson (6'5", 258), Daryle Smith (6'5", 257), John Bruhin (6'4", 273), and Harry Galbreath (6'1", 260).  Todd Kirk (6'3", 257) was the starting center.  Tony Williams (6'3", 272) would also see playing time.

On defense, the Vols had lost three linebackers to the NFL Draft: Carl Zander, Alvin Toles, and Reggie McKenzie.  The key returning linebacker was Dale Jones, who had registered 109 tackles in 1984, and had garnered a reputation for making big plays.  Jones was joined by senior Lavoisier Fisher, junior Tyrone Robinson, sophomores Kelly Ziegler and Darrin Miller, and freshman Bryan Kimbro.  The defensive line was led by senior Richard Brown (6'1", 263 pounds) and junior Robby Scott (6'1", 274), while sophomores Mark Hovanic (6'3", 245), Fred Bennett (6'0", 258) and Richard Cooper (6'6", 272) had shown promise as freshmen.

The Vols' secondary was considered the strongest part of the defense at the beginning of the season, with Tommy Sims and Terry Brown registering strong seasons in 1984.  They were joined by junior Charles Davis and sophomores Terry McDaniel, Andre Creamer and Victor Peppers.  Chris White, a fifth-year senior who had seen scant playing time prior the 1985 season, would come off the bench to lead the team with 9 interceptions and receive All-American honors.

The Vols' special teams were also dealing with inexperience, having lost kicker Fuad Reveiz and punter Jimmy Colquitt to the NFL.  Carlos Reveiz, Fuad's younger brother, stepped in at kicker, while sophomore Bob Garmon was named the starting punter.  Joel Farmer was the team's long snapper, while Randy Sanders was the primary holder.  Tim McGee and Andre Creamer handled punt returns, while Pete Panuska, Keith Davis, and Jeff Powell handled kick returns at various times during the season.

Coaching staff
Head coach Johnny Majors had compiled a 108–82–5 record during his 17 years as a head coach, which included five seasons with Iowa State (1968–1972), four with Pittsburgh (1973–1976), and eight with Tennessee (1977–1984).  His record at UT at the start of the 1985 season was 51–39–3.  While he had taken the Vols to four consecutive bowl games, he had yet to win an SEC Championship.

The most notable addition to the Tennessee coaching staff was Ken Donahue, who had worked as an assistant coach under Alabama's Bear Bryant for 21 years.  Donahue was initially hired as a defensive line coach in February 1985, but was promoted to defensive coordinator in March after Larry Marmie announced he was leaving for Arizona State.  Prior to Spring practice, long-time Vol assistant George Cafego retired.  In late March, the Vols hired Tennessee Tech defensive coordinator Dick Bumpas to coach linebackers.

Four members of the 1985 staff later became head coaches at Division I programs: Walt Harris, Phillip Fulmer, David Cutcliffe and Ron Zook.  Kippy Brown has worked as an assistant coach in the NFL, and was briefly UT's interim head coach following the abrupt departure of Lane Kiffin in January 2010.  Gerald Brown, an administrative assistant, later became the running backs coach for the Atlanta Falcons.

Bruno Pauletto, the Vols' strength coach, was an Olympic shot putter who won the gold medal for the Canadian team at the 1982 Commonwealth Games, and was a member of the Canadian team at the 1984 Olympics.

Schedule
The Vols opened the 1985 campaign hosting #10 UCLA, which was coming off a 9–3 season in 1984, and had defeated defending national champion BYU in their first game of the 1985 season.  Bruins coach Terry Donahue entered the game needing one win to become UCLA's all-time winningest football coach.  The Bruins' offense featured running back Gaston Green, two future NFL receivers, Willie "Flipper" Anderson and Mike Sherrard, and All-American kicker John Lee.  Matt Stevens and David Norrie were vying for time at quarterback.

Following a bye week, the Vols hosted the Auburn Tigers, who entered the game ranked #1 in the nation, and had defeated the Vols in the teams' previous three meetings.  The Tigers' offense was led by eventual Heisman Trophy winner Bo Jackson, who had averaged 247.5 yards per game and nearly 10 yards per carry in his first two games of the season.  Auburn struggled with uncertainty at quarterback, however, with Jeff Burger, Bobby Walden, and Pat Washington all vying for the starting position.

After hosting Wake Forest, the Vols traveled to Gainesville to play the Florida Gators. Florida coach Galen Hall entered the game with an 11–0–1 record, having shut out LSU the previous week. Florida's offense featured the school's all-time leading rusher Neal Anderson and John L. Williams in the backfield, quarterback Kerwin Bell, and future NFL receiver Ricky Nattiel.  Many Gator fans saw this game as an opportunity for revenge, as they blamed Tennessee for leading the movement to strip the Gators of their 1984 SEC Championship for rules violations committed under Hall's predecessor, Charley Pell.

In the fifth game of the season, the Vols visited Alabama for the "Third Saturday in October" rivalry.  The Tide entered the game 4–1 following a 19–17 loss to Penn State in the previous week.  The Vols had won the teams' previous three meetings, and desperately needed a win to stay in contention for the SEC Championship.  The Tide was led by quarterback Mike Shula (the son of NFL coach Don Shula) and future All-American running back Bobby Humphrey on offense, and All-American linebacker Cornelius Bennett on defense.

Tennessee hosted Georgia Tech for its sixth game of the season.  The Yellow Jackets entered the game 4–2 following a narrow loss to Auburn in the previous week.  The Vols had edged Georgia Tech 24–21 the previous year, but were playing without star quarterback Tony Robinson, who had suffered a season-ending knee injury against Alabama.  The Yellow Jackets' offense was led by All-ACC quarterback John Dewberry and receiver Gary Lee, though leading rushers Cory Collier and Jerry Mays were out with injuries. Linebacker Ted Roof and lineman Pat Swilling led the Jackets' elite "Black Watch" unit on defense.

After playing Rutgers in Knoxville and visiting Memphis State, the Vols began their final conference stretch by hosting Ole Miss.  A tie between Alabama and LSU the previous week had left Tennessee and Florida tied for first place in the conference, and with Florida ineligible, the Vols needed only to win their final three games to win the SEC Championship.  The Rebels were led by freshman quarterback Chris Osgood (starting in place of the injured Kent Austin), running back Nathan Wonsley, and receiver J.R. Ambrose.

In the next-to-last game of the regular season, the Vols traveled to Lexington to play Kentucky in the annual Battle for the Barrel.  Kentucky entered the game 5–5 under fourth-year head coach Jerry Claiborne, and had won the teams' previous meeting in Knoxville, 17–12.  In the final game of the regular season, the Vols played host to Vanderbilt, which entered the game 3–6–1.

As SEC champions, Tennessee received an automatic berth in the 1986 Sugar Bowl, played on New Year's Day in New Orleans.  Their opponent, Miami, entered the game with a 10-game winning streak, which was capped by a 58–7 blowout of Notre Dame.  Ranked #2 in the nation, Miami needed a win over Tennessee and a loss by Penn State in the Orange Bowl to lay claim to the national title.  Under second-year coach Jimmy Johnson, the Hurricanes featured numerous future NFL players, including quarterback Vinny Testaverde, running backs Alonzo Highsmith, Warren Williams, and Mel Bratton, receivers Michael Irvin and Brian Blades, All-American tight end Willie Smith, and a defense led by linemen Jerome Brown and Kevin Fagan, linebacker Winston Moss, and defensive back Bennie Blades. The Vols would go on to destroy the overconfident Miami Hurricanes 35-7.

Game summaries

UCLA

Auburn

Wake Forest

Florida

Alabama

Georgia Tech

Rutgers

Memphis State

Ole Miss

Kentucky

Vanderbilt

Miami (Sugar Bowl)

End of season

Statistical leaders (regular season)

Passing: Tony Robinson 91/143, 1246, 8 TD, 7 INT; Daryl Dickey 85/131, 1161, 10 TD, 1 INT; Jeff Francis 14/20, 172, 1 TD, 1 INT
Receiving: Tim McGee 50-947-7; Joey Clinkscales 22-434-4; Jeff Smith 20-397; Eric Swanson 24-300-4
Rushing: Keith Davis 141-684-2; Jeff Powell 55-235; Sam Henderson 53-175-2; Pete Panuska 39-196-3; Tony Robinson 44-201-1
Tackles: Kelly Ziegler 101 (83 solo), Darrin Miller 94 (67), Dale Jones 82 (59), Tommy Sims 62 (42), Chris White 62 (34)
Tackles for loss: Dale Jones 9
Sacks: Mark Hovanic 8, Dale Jones 5, Richard Cooper 5
Interceptions: Chris White 9, Charles Davis 3
Passes broken-up: Andre Creamer 6, Tommy Sims 5, Richard Cooper 5
Forced fumbles: Dale Jones 5, Darrin Miller 4
Fumbles recovered: Chris White 3
Kicking: Carlos Reveiz 24/28 field goals, 30/30 PAT
Punting: Bob Garmon 39.1 yards/punt
Source:

Honors

 Tim McGee (WR): First-team All-American, All-SEC
 Chris White (DB): First-team All-American, All-SEC
 Dale Jones (LB): All-SEC
 Carlos Reveiz (PK): All-SEC
 Bruce Wilkerson (OL): All-SEC
 Daryl Dickey (QB): Sugar Bowl Most Valuable Player
 Troy Hale (WR): Academic All-SEC
 Randy Sanders (QB): Academic All-SEC
 Johnny Majors (HC): SEC Coach of the Year
 Ken Donahue (DC): SEC Assistant Coach of the Year
Source:

New school records

Most passing yards in a game: 387, Tony Robinson (vs. UCLA)
Most touchdown passes in a game: 4 (tie), Tony Robinson (vs. Auburn)
Most interceptions in a game: 3 (tie), Chris White (vs. UCLA)*
Consecutive passes without an interception: 106, Daryl Dickey
Highest single-season completion percentage (min. 100 attempts): 64.9%, Daryl Dickey*
Highest career completion percentage (min. 100 attempts): 63%, Daryl Dickey (1981–1985)*
Lowest career interception percentage: 1.2%, Daryl Dickey (1981–1985)
Most single-season receiving yards: 947, Tim McGee 
Most single-season touchdown receptions: 7 (tie), Tim McGee
Most career receptions: 123, Tim McGee (1982–1985)
Most career receiving yards: 2,042, Tim McGee (1982–1985)
Most career touchdown receptions: 16, Tim McGee (1982–1985)
Most single-season points by kicking: 102, Carlos Reveiz
Fewest team fumbles lost: 5
* Indicates record still stands as of the 2012 season
Source:Records .  UTSports.com.  Retrieved: April 10, 2013.

Team players drafted into the NFL

Reference:

References

Tennessee
Tennessee Volunteers football seasons
Southeastern Conference football champion seasons
Sugar Bowl champion seasons
Tennessee Volunteers football